Harry Alexander Forrest (26 March 1881 – 16 November 1964) was a British fencer. He competed in the team sabre event at the 1928 Summer Olympics.

References

1881 births
1964 deaths
British male fencers
Olympic fencers of Great Britain
Fencers at the 1928 Summer Olympics
Sportspeople from Blackburn